Juan Cruz Mallía is an Argentinian rugby union player. He plays as a full-back, wing or centre for Toulouse and the Argentina national rugby union team.

Career
Mallía played for the Jaguares in Super Rugby.

In 2021, he won the European Rugby Champions Cup playing for Toulouse, scoring their only try in the final. A few weeks later, we won his first Top 14 title in a 18–8 win against La Rochelle in final.

Style of play
Mallía can be described as a utility back, like James O'Connor or Adam Ashley-Cooper, being able to play from 11 to 15 and starting more than ten professional games in each position.

Honours

Jaguares XV
 Currie Cup First Division: 2019

Toulouse
 European Rugby Champions Cup: 2020–21
 Top 14: 2020-21

Argentina XV
 Americas Pacific Challenge: 2017

References

External links
All.Rugby
ESPN
Rugby Pass
Stade Toulousain

1996 births
Living people
Argentine rugby union players
Jaguares (Super Rugby) players
Rugby union wings
Argentina international rugby union players
Stade Toulousain players
Argentine expatriate sportspeople in France
Argentine expatriate rugby union players
Expatriate rugby union players in France
Sportspeople from Córdoba, Argentina